The California International Marathon (CIM) is an annual road marathon held in Northern California since 1983.  The net downhill course starts at Folsom Dam and ends at the State Capitol in Sacramento.  The race is organized by the Sacramento Running Association.

History 

In 1983, marathoner John Mansoor and entrepreneur Sally Edwards organized the first CIM, anticipating an opportunity to also be an Olympic Marathon Trials qualifier. CIM served as the United States National Marathon Championship for men in 1984 and for women in 1984, 1985, 1989, and 1993. It again served as the USA Marathon Championship in 2017 and 2018.

In 1988, Sacramento artist Phil Dynan became the first official race artist appointed by the CIM Board of Directors. Dynan's art was used for five years. His initial design showed a pack of runners with the Sierra foothills behind them.

On December 2, 1990, Waheed Karim set an Afghan national record with his 22nd place finish by covering the marathon distance in 2:28:46.

The 2020 edition of the race was cancelled due to the coronavirus pandemic, with all registrants given the option of transferring their entry to 2021, 2022, or 2023. On December 5, 2021, Sara Vaughn broke the women's course record, which had stood for 8 years, with a winning time of 2:26:53.

Course 

The course follows a historic gold miners' round beginning at Folsom Dam, passing through suburban Sacramento, and ending at the State Capitol.

Winners 

Key: Course record

References

External links
Race profile at the Association of Road Racing Statisticians' website

Marathons in California
Marathons in the United States
Foot races in California
Recurring sporting events established in 1983